O'Hagan is an Irish surname originally from the pre 10th century Old Gaelic Ó hAodhagáin, meaning perhaps "Little Fire from the Sun", being derived from Aodh the pagan sun god and Og meaning young, they are the "male descendant of Aodh" the pagan sun god, a personal name meaning "fire".  Aodh was a pagan god worshipped by the early natives. The first recorded O'Hagan was a district justice of the peace

Family history 

Until the destruction of Gaelic order in the 17th century the O'Hagans were the chief Brehons to the Cinel Eoghain, and holding the title Lord of Tulach Óg in County Tyrone, Northern Ireland. The chief exercised the hereditary right of inaugurating O'Neill as king or overlord of Ulster. In medieval times, members of the sept were territorial magnates in Counties Monaghan and Armagh, and two places called Ballyagan, (from "baile", a settlement), one in County Londonderry and the other in County Antrim, further locate the O'Hagans.

Chiefs of the Clan Feargusa, they descended from Fergus Cerrbél mac Conaill Cremthainne (Fergus Crooked Mouth) grandson of Niall of the Nine Hostages said to be High King of Ireland from 370 to 406 who in turn descends from Conn of the Hundred Battles the Milesian Gaelic King of Tara / Ireland in the 2nd century. For over six hundred years the O'Hagans were hereditary brehons and inaugurators of O'Neill (surname) who were descended from the Uí Néill.

Before the 13th century branches of the sept were established in County Monaghan and County Armagh and soon spread into the neighbouring counties of Antrim, Londonderry and Down. Two places called Ballyagan, one in County Londonderry and the other in County Antrim attest to the O'Hagans' predominance in the region.

The high chair at Tullyhogue 

According to tradition, O'Hagan inaugurated O'Neill by putting on his slipper hence the shoe always appears in the Coat of Arms. O'Hagan Gaelic meaning on coat of arms. "Vincere aut mori" meaning Victory or death.  Quoted from family coat of arms crest/shield. The inauguration took place at the coronation chair on the O'Hagan lands at Tullyhogue Fort. In the 16th century the 'Leac na Rí', or Stone of the Kings, inauguration stone, which is said to be blessed by Saint Patrick, was embedded in the coronation chair. The  chair was destroyed around 1602 at the orders of Lord Mountjoy before the surrender of Hugh O'Neill to Mountjoy. O'Hagans are one of the oldest families in Omeath Co.Louth, arrived when O'Neill attacked Mountjoy at narrowwater on his journey to Carlingford.

Flight of the Earls 

During the 17th century O'Hagans staunchly opposed English aggression and a number were at the Battle of Kinsale in 1603, suffering great losses with the dispossessions that followed. Some were hanged at Carrickfergus County Antrim.

There were several O'Hagans among the 98 who fled the north of Ireland in 1607 with Hugh O'Neill, 2nd Earl of Tyrone and Rory O'Donnell, 1st Earl of Tyrconnell in an event commonly referred to as the Flight of the Earls which marked the end of the Gaelic order in Ireland.

Premodern O'Hagans 

 Turlough O'Hagan Chief of the Name who journeyed to Wicklow in 1590 to escort Hugh O'Donnell and two children of Shane O'Neill to Ulster following the latter's dramatic escape from imprisonment in Dublin Castle. Turlough is also the  fictional narrator in the  Hibernian Nights stories published by the Dublin College Press from 1863–1865
 Ivor O'Hagan tutor of St Malachy, first recorded spelling of family name which was dated circa 1100, Medieval Records of County Armagh, during the reign of High Kings of Ireland, "with opposition", 1022 - 1166.

Notable people named O'Hagan 

 Bill O'Hagan (1944–2013), journalist and butcher
 Charles O'Hagan (1881–1931), Irish football player and manager
 Damien O'Hagan, football player
 Dan O'Hagan, football commentator and TV presenter
 Dara O'Hagan (b.1964), nationalist politician in Northern Ireland
 Des O'Hagan (1934–2015), member of the Workers' Party of Ireland 
 Hal O'Hagan (1869–1913), US baseball player
 Jack O'Hagan (1898–1987), Australian musician 
 Joseph O'Hagan (1900–1978), British trade union leader
 Joe B. O'Hagan, Provisional IRA member, died 23 April 2001.
Joseph B. O'Hagan (1826–1878), Irish-American Jesuit
 John O'Hagan (b.1993), International male model
 John O'Hagan (1822–1890) patriot poet and judge
 John T. O'Hagan (1925–1991), Fire Commissioner of the City of New York 
 Martin O'Hagan (1950–2001), Irish investigative journalist, assassinated
 Maurice Towneley-O'Hagan, 3rd Baron O'Hagan (1882–1961), British politician
 Patrick O'Hagan (1924-1993), Irish-Australian tenor singer father of singer Johnny Logan 
 Peter O'Hagan (d.2009), Northern Irish politician
 Ruairí O'Hagan (1983-), sports broadcaster and radio presenter
 Sean O'Hagan, Irish musician who has been a member of Microdisney, the High Llamas and Stereolab
 Sean O'Hagan (journalist), Northern Irish journalist, particularly about music and photography
 Sheila O'Hagan, Irish poet
 Thomas O'Hagan, 1st Baron O'Hagan (1812–1885) first Catholic Lord Chancellor of Ireland since James II with peerage title of Baron O'Hagan
 Thomas O'Hagan (Australian judge) (d.1958), Australian judge
 Thomas Towneley O'Hagan, 2nd Baron O'Hagan (1878–1900), landowner
 Úna O'Hagan (b.1962), Irish journalist and newsreader

References 

English-language surnames
Irish families
Surnames of Irish origin